Urs Burkart (born January 9, 1978) is a former Swiss professional ice hockey defenceman who played Switzerland's National League A for EHC Kloten and EV Zug.

Burkart participated as a member of the Swiss national team at the 1988 Winter Olympics.

He is currently F&ACE coordinator.

References

External links

1963 births
Living people
EV Zug players
HC Forward-Morges players
Ice hockey players at the 1988 Winter Olympics
EHC Kloten players
Lausanne HC players
Olympic ice hockey players of Switzerland
Ice hockey people from Zürich
Swiss ice hockey defencemen